Alfred Philip (Alf) Cooper b 1950) is an Anglican bishop in Chile.

Cooper was educated at the University of Bristol and ordained in 1978. He has spent his career as a missionary in Chile. He was consecrated in 2016.

References

1950 births
21st-century Anglican bishops in South America
Living people
Alumni of the University of Bristol